The Caverns of Thracia is an adventure for fantasy role-playing games published by Judges Guild in 1979. Written by Jennell Jaquays, it was compatible with Dungeons & Dragons. A revised edition—compatible with Dungeons & Dragons 3.5 edition—was published in 2004.

Contents
The Caverns of Thracia is a scenario with a Greek mythical background that describes an intricate dungeon complex and lost city. The upper levels are for low-level player characters; lower levels are more difficult.

This supplement represents a series of rooms and caverns which have had many previous owners. Long ago they were a religious center for lizard men but were taken over by humans worshipping Thanatos, the god of death. The humans used beast men (gnolls, minotaurs, dog brothers, etc.) for slaves. The slaves rebelled, and the caverns changed hands again. The beast men chose an intelligent minotaur to rule them. His descendants still reign. The caverns are now in the hands of the minotaur king, except for a small part of the first level, still controlled by the worshippers of Thanatos. This dungeon is for characters of levels 2 through 6.

The Caverns of Thracia is an extensive setting and the text provides a great deal of historical background which fleshes out the adventure.

Publication history
The Caverns of Thracia was written by Jennell Jaquays and published by Judges Guild in 1979 as an 80-page book.

Clark Peterson of Necromancer Games ran an adventure "Return to the Caverns of Thracia" based on the old adventure, as a tournament at the 2002 Gen Con Game Fair, and Necromancer put out a revised Caverns of Thracia in 2004, updated for 3.5 edition, but that was the last of their licensed publications before their license with Judges Guild lapsed.

Reception
Don Turnbull reviewed The Caverns of Thracia for White Dwarf #17 and rated it an 8 out of 10. He commented that "There are a few errors [...] and some cumbersome elements [...] but on the whole this is a thorough piece of work." Turnbull concluded his review by commenting on Judges Guild adventures in general: "Inevitably, there remains the comparison with the TSR Modules, and I am bound to say that none of the Judges Guild products I have met so far hang together quite as well as the TSR Modules. There is a feeling of randomness about Caverns of Thracia, Dark Tower and the others which is not present in the TSR Modules, and one gets the impression that the coherence is incomplete.  The TSR productions should be regarded, not as an unattainable height, but as a target of quality which should be equaled or even surpassed.  That the two designs by [Jennell] Jaquays come closest in quality to the TSR standard is reassuring, since it seems that at least [Jennell] is making the effort."

Steve Cook reviewed The Caverns of Thracia in The Space Gamer No. 29. Cook commented that "A strong point of the game is its flexibility and variety. There are monsters that any low-level character could successfully tackle, but others will make even the bravest run. The fact that there are two opposing sides in the caverns opens up the possibility of the players allying themselves with one of the sides." He continues: "The major problem of this game is that there are too many monsters. It seems you can't go ten feet without being jumped by gnolls, minotaurs, or other nasties. Another problem is that monsters which could be surprises aren't. Skeletons, dead bodies, statues, etc., are animated nearly every time." Cook concluded his review by saying, "Overall, the good points greatly outweigh the bad. My player's reactions have been very positive toward this dungeon. If you want an exciting adventure for D&D, then The Caverns of Thracia is for you."

Patrick Amory reviewed Caverns of Thracia for Different Worlds magazine and stated that "this D&D dungeon is an example of Judges Guild at their best. Well thought out and entertaining, based on Greek mythology, the Caverns will provide hours of full play. This package is propably near to being the best D&D play-aid on the market."

Since then, The Caverns of Thracia has come to be regarded as one of the classics of the genre, particularly within the Old School Renaissance community. Within this community, creating a dungeon that matches the amount of flexibility presented to the players in terms of available exploration paths and interactive factions has become known as Jaquaying a dungeon (a term coined by Justin Alexander of The Alexandrian blog). James Maliszewski of Grognardia called it "a good example of why Judges Guild is remembered so fondly by so many of us who started gaming in the 70s."

Reviews
 Different Worlds #6 (Dec 1979)

Notes

References

Dungeons & Dragons modules
Judges Guild fantasy role-playing game adventures
Role-playing game supplements introduced in 1979